Macrozamia longispina is a species of plant in the family Zamiaceae. It is endemic to Australia.

References

longispina
Least concern biota of Queensland
Least concern flora of Australia
Nature Conservation Act rare biota
Rare flora of Australia
Flora of Queensland
Taxonomy articles created by Polbot
Taxa named by Paul Irwin Forster
Taxa named by David L. Jones (botanist)